Terrorism in Italy from 1945 To Date is a book written by Giovanni Pellegrino, an Italian lawyer and politician. It discusses the political situation in Italy from the revival of democracy in 1945 until the present day.

Giovanni Pellegrino, who for many years was President of the Italian Parliamentary Commission on Terrorism and an expert on terrorism in Italy, argued that in Italy there was a low-intensity civil war, beginning from 1945 to date between the Western and Eastern Europe, and between democracy and communism. This "war" reached its peaked between 1945 and 1949 after World War II.
With the writer Giovanni Fasanella he coauthored a book, La Guerra Civile (the Civil War) wherein he expressed his opinion on the seeming 60 years long low intensity civil war in Italy.

This book x-rays the specific Italian situation in contra distinction to other European countries, especially Spain and Ireland. According to the authors, while these two European countries have similar terror situations, they however differ in their political engagements and precise causes of terrorism different from Italy:
 Spain with the Basque ethnic conflict and
 Ireland with a long  ethnic conflict and religion-political conflict.

The time frame between 1943 till date is spaced over 11 chapters, and is divided into 4 groups, corresponding to 4 time periods.

Chapters 
The book has an introduction, 11 chapters, one analytic index, one book index.
The introduction: "Una storia non conoscibile" based about an unknown History.

Chapter 1: "La Volante rossa", about communist terrorism after the World War II.
Chapter 2: "Atlantici d'Italia", about structures in Italy favorable to Atlantic politics.
Chapter 3: "Il compromesso democratico", about an agreement between Communists and Democrats.
Chapter 4: "La rottura dell'equilibrio", about the crisis of the agreement.
Chapter 5: "La guerra civile a bassa intensità", about the low intensity civil war.
Chapter 6: "Moro e Berlinguer", about the two important leaders.
Chapter 7: "I naufraghi del Titanic", about the old political class, not looking to the future.
Chapter 8: "La rottura del patto di indicibilità", about he breaking of the pact.
Chapter 9: "Il disegno tecnocratico", about one emerging technocratic politic class.
Chapter 10: "Fenomeno Berlusconi", about an emerging new leader.
Chapter 11; "Il sogno infranto della Bicamerale", about the failed attempt to create new politics regulation.

Indice analitico: Name Index
Indice del volume: Book Index

See also 
History of the Italian Republic
Giovanni Pellegrino * for more years president of Commissione Stragi.
Years of lead (Italy) (1969–1989)

References

Bibliography 
 Fasanella Giovanni, Pellegrino Giovanni, La guerra civile, Editore : BUR Biblioteca Univ. Rizzoli, 2005.  – A book about the more as 60 years long low intensity civil war in Italy.
 Aga-Rossi Elena – Zaslavsky Victor :  Togliatti e Stalin. Il PCI e la politica estera staliniana negli archivi di Mosca – Editore: Il Mulino – 2007.

External links 
 Commissione parlamentare d'inchiesta sul terrorismo in Italia e sulle cause della mancata individuazione dei responsabili delle stragi

History books about Italy

20th century in Italy
21st century in Italy
Italian books